Calliderma may refer to:

 a synonym for Cephalochetus, a genus of beetles in the family Staphylinidae
 Calliderma (fungus), a genus of Basidiomycota in the family Entolomataceae
 Calliderma (sea star), an extinct genus of echinoderms in the family Goniasteridae